Unicon is a programming language designed by American computer scientist Clint Jeffery with collaborators including Shamim Mohamed, Jafar Al Gharaibeh, Robert Parlett and others. Unicon descended from Icon and a preprocessor for Icon called IDOL. Compared with Icon, Unicon offers better access to the operating system as well as support for object-oriented programming. Unicon began life as a merger of three popular Icon extensions: an OO preprocessor named Idol, a POSIX filesystem and networking interface, and an ODBC facility. The name is shorthand for "Unified Extended Dialect of Icon."

Features 
Compared with Icon, many of the new features of Unicon are extensions to the I/O and system interface, to complement Icon's core control and data structures. Rather than providing lower-level APIs as-is from C, Unicon implements higher level and easier to use facilities, enabling rapid development of graphic- and network-intensive applications in addition to Icon's core strengths in text and file processing.

Feature list 
 Classes and packages
Exceptions as a contributed class library - see mailing list
 Loadable child programs
 Monitoring of child programs
 Dynamic loading of C modules (some platforms)
 Multiple inheritance, with novel semantics
 ODBC database access
 dbm files can be used as associative arrays
 Posix system interface
 3D graphics
 True concurrency (on platforms supporting Posix threads)

When run as a graphical IDE, the Unicon program ui.exe continues to offer links to Icon help.

The official Unicon programming book in PDF format is a popular way to learn Unicon. The book includes an introduction to object-oriented development as well as UML. It includes useful chapters on topics such as the use of Unicon for CGI. Recent additions to Unicon include true concurrency.

Unicode 
Unicon is not yet Unicode-compliant. There are opportunities posted at a help-wanted page.

Example code
procedure main()
	w := open("test UNICON window", "g")
	write(w, "Hello, World!")
	read(w)
	close(w)
end

See also
 Rebol, a similar web-oriented expression-based language without the use of keywords
 Curl, multi-paradigm web content functional language which is also expression-based but only for client-side
 Coroutine
 Generators
 Continuation

References

External links
 
 Unicon Programming book
 Posix Interface for Unicon 
 ADAPTING SNOBOL-STYLE PATTERNS TO UNICON
 Java version of Icon
 Unicon at 99-bottles 
 Literate programs

Icon programming language family
Pattern matching programming languages
Text-oriented programming languages
SNOBOL programming language family